John Joyner Snow Jr. (born October 24, 1945) is an American politician, attorney, and former football player who served as a member of the North Carolina Senate, for the 50th district from 2005 to 2011. His district included Cherokee, Clay, Graham, Haywood, Jackson, Macon, Swain and Transylvania counties. Snow was the co-chair of the Subcommittee on Justice and Public Safety.

Early life and education 
Snow was born in Asheville, North Carolina. He earned a Bachelor of Arts degree from Wake Forest University and Juris Doctor from the Wake Forest University School of Law. Snow was a defensive tackle for Wake Forest University, and was drafted in the 15th round of the 1967 NFL Draft by the New Orleans Saints.

Career 
In 1967, Snow served in the United States Army. After law school Snow worked as an Assistant District Attorney. He later served as a District Court Judge from 1976 to 1986 and Chief District Court Judge from 1996 to 2004. He took office as a member of the North Carolina Senate in 2005.

Franklin orthodontist Jim Davis defeated Snow in 2010 by a margin of less than 200 votes after Snow was subjected to two dozen mass-mailed negative ads during the election. After the election, it was revealed that many of the mail-outs were funded by groups founded by businessman Art Pope, including Civitas Action and Real Jobs NC. In 2012, Snow ran in a re-match with Davis to return to his former seat in the Senate. He was defeated by a substantial margin of 12,548 votes.

References

External links
John Snow North Carolina Senator official website
North Carolina General Assembly - Senator John Snow official NC Senate website
Project Vote Smart - Senator John J. Snow Jr. (NC) profile
Follow the Money - John J. Snow Jr.
2008 2006 2004 campaign contributions

North Carolina state senators
North Carolina state court judges
Living people
1945 births
21st-century American politicians
People from Murphy, North Carolina